Slavik Nyu (born 23 September 1969) is a Kazakhstani weightlifter. He competed in the men's middle heavyweight event at the 2000 Summer Olympics.

References

1969 births
Living people
Kazakhstani male weightlifters
Olympic weightlifters of Kazakhstan
Weightlifters at the 2000 Summer Olympics
Sportspeople from Tashkent
Weightlifters at the 1998 Asian Games
Asian Games competitors for Kazakhstan